Snoeren is a surname. Notable people with the surname include:

Alex Snoeren, American computer scientist
Marinus Snoeren (1919–1982), Dutch cellist and music educator
Mark Snoeren (born 1974), Dutch politician
Rolf Snoeren (born 1969), Dutch fashion designer